"Katse Kala" is the fourth single from the album Protereotita released in November 2004. Helena Paparizou stated for the song that it is among her favourites and performs it in her every resident show in Greece. The audience is stick to this song causing happiness and entertainment at the bouzoukia.

Music video
The music video was filmed in 2004 of the same month of its release. Helena appeared for the very first time totally sexy with black shirt outfit and Yamaha motorbikes surrounding her. The scene reminded Christina Aguilera's single ""Dirrty". Also, the song was nominated at the Mad Video Music Awards in 2005 and won the category for Best Video by a Female Artist. Also, it was nominated but failed to win Best Dance Video, Most Played Artist and Most Sexy Appearance in a Video.

Track listing
1. "Katse Kala" (Κάτσε Καλά; Behave yourself) Nikki P., Toni Mavridis Alex Papaconstantinou, Peter Cartries 4:24

References 

2004 singles
Helena Paparizou songs
MAD Video Music Award for Best Female Artist
Pop ballads
Song recordings produced by Alex P
Greek-language songs
2004 songs